The Gwangsan Kim clan (Hangul: 광산 김씨, Hanja: 光山 金氏) is a Korean clan with its bon-gwan located in Gwangsan, present-day Gwangju.

The members of the Gwangsan Kim clan are the descendants of Kim Heung-gwang (김흥광), the third son of King Sinmu of Silla, the 45th monarch of the Silla.

The family has produced eminent Neo-Confucian scholars during the Joseon Dynasty, including Kim Jang-saeng, Kim Jip, and Kim Man-jung.

Known descendants 
 Maria Kim (1891–1944), Korean independence activist
 Stephen Kim Sou-hwan (1922–2009), South Korean cardinal
 Kim Yong-san (1922–2011), South Korean businessman
 Kim Chunsu (1922–2004), South Korean poet
 Kim Woo-choong (1936–2019), South Korean businessman, founder and chairman of Daewoo Group
 Kim Yong-gun (born 1946), South Korean actor
 Kim Jang-soo (born 1948), South Korean general and politician, Minister of Defence (2006–2008)
 Kim Hwang-sik (born 1948), South Korean politician, 37th Prime Minister of South Korea
 Kim Sang-joong (born 1965), South Korean actor
 Kim Soo-ro (born 1970), South Korean actor
 Kim Taek-soo (born 1970), South Korean table tennis player
 Suki Kim (born 1970), Korean-American journalist and writer
 Kim Myung-min (born 1972), South Korean actor
 Kim Ah-joong (born 1982), South Korean actress
 Paul Kim (born 1988), South Korean singer-songwriter
 Kim Yu-jin (born 1988), also known as Uee, South Korean actress and former member of girl group After School
 Kim Yong-sun (born 1991), also known as Solar, South Korean singer and member of girl group Mamamoo
 Kim Seok-jin (born 1992), also known as Jin, South Korean singer and member of boy band BTS
 Kim Tae-hyung (born 1995), also known as V, South Korean singer and member of boy band BTS

See also
 Kim Jang-saeng
 Kim Jip
 Queen Ingyeong
 Kim Man-jung
 Kim Ik-hun

References

External links
http://100.naver.com/100.nhn?docid=773233